Dogs (aka Les Dogs) were a French punk rock/new wave band from Rouen, formed in 1973. Allmusic describes them as a "treasured cult band". Following two EPs in 1977/1978, their debut album Different was released in 1979 on Mercury Records; Different Shadows followed in 1980. The band continued with various line ups, releasing ten more albums before the death of vocalist – and only constant member – Dominique Laboubée, in 2002.

Band line-ups

Discography

Albums
 1979 – Different (Phonogram, 33 T)
 1980 – Walking Shadows (Phonogram, 33 T)
 1982 – Too Much Class for the Neighbourhood (Epic, 33 T)
 1983 – Legendary Lovers (Epic, 33 T)
 1985 – Shout (Epic, 33 T)
 1986 – More, More, More (Epic, 33 T)
 1988 – A Million Ways of Killing Time (New Rose, 33 T)
 1993 – Three is a Crowd (Skydog / Mélodie, CD)
 1998 – 4 of a Kind, Vol.1 (Hacienda, CD)
 1999 – 4 of a Kind, Vol.2: A Different Kind (Hacienda, CD)
 2001 – Short, Fast & Tight (Hacienda, Double CD)

Compilations
 1987 – Shakin' with the Dogs – Compilation (Epic, 33 T)
 2017 – Rehearsals 1974

References

External links
 "Les Dogs" – The Official Dogs Web Page
 Dogs connection – A website dedicated to the band
 Unofficial website
 Complete discography and videos on SoundUnwound

French punk rock groups
Musical groups established in 1973
Musical groups from Normandy
French garage rock groups